Pleasant Mount may refer to:

 Pleasant Mount, Missouri
 Pleasant Mount, Pennsylvania